Poeševo is a village in the municipality of Bitola, North Macedonia.

Demographics
Poeševo is attested in the Ottoman defter of 1467/68 as a village in the vilayet of Manastir. The e inhabitants  attested bore a mixed Slavic-Albanian anthroponymy, such as Dedie Radosllav.

According to the 2002 census, the village had a total of 272 inhabitants. Ethnic groups in the village include:

Macedonians 266 
Albanians 6

Sports
Local football club FK Poeševo plays in the OFS Bitola First Division.

References

External links

Villages in Bitola Municipality